Indic languages may refer to:
 Indo-Aryan languages, a subgroup of the Indo-European languages spoken mainly in the north of the Indian subcontinent
 Languages of the Indian subcontinent, all the indigenous languages of the region regardless of language family

See also 
 Languages of India
 Indigenous languages of the Americas

 Language and nationality disambiguation pages